Magic is the seventh studio album by American singer/songwriter Ben Rector. The album was released on June 22, 2018 through OK Kid Recordings via AWAL and peaked at No. 1 on the Billboard Americana/Folk Albums chart and No. 44 on the Billboard 200.

Track listing

References 

2018 albums
Ben Rector albums